Jérémy Chatelain (born 19 October 1984) is a French singer, actor, and fashion designer. In 2003, he married Alizée Jacotey with whom he has a child, Annily. Since 2011, Jérémy and Alizée have lived separately. He participated in the second season (2002–2003) of the reality TV show Star Academy France.

Career
He was born on 19 October 1984 in Créteil, Val-de-Marne, France. 
In order to enter the Star Academy, Jérémy lied about his age claiming, during the casting process, to be 18 at a time when he was only 17. At this young age he proved to have many talents, focusing in particular on music and clothes designing. He demonstrated strong ability as both a songwriter a musician (the piano being his instrument of choice).

The second season of the Star Academy began in September 2002 on TF1. Jérémy quickly proved to be a favourite contestant, easily possessing the best sense of style, originality and charisma that won the votes of many. However he was eliminated from the show in November, after 2 months and a half of living in the Star Academy château.

Jérémy toured France, Belgium and Switzerland with the rest of the contestants of the Star Academy in early 2003. At the same time, he also prepared for a solo career.

On 28 February 2003, he released his first single Laisse-moi ("Leave Me", in English), which sold over 170,000 copies and hit the Top 10 of the French Top 50 Singles Chart. His second single, Belle Histoire ("Beautiful Story"), followed in July 2003.

During late summer of 2003, he was approached by the controversial French figure Bernard Tapie to star in an episode (especially made for him) of the French series Commissaire Valence. He accepted and the episode was filmed in Paris in September, airing January 2004.

He released his first self-titled album on 28 October 2003, with the third single Vivre Ça ("To Live Like That"), a song about social issues that maintained a serious tone whilst at the same time possessing a pop/rock sound. It was released in December 2003. He wrote or co-wrote and composed eleven of the twelve songs on the album. At this time, he was also a guest on the third season (2003–2004) of the Star Academy, performing Vivre Ça along with one of the contestants.

J'aimerai ("I Will Love"), the fourth and final single from his self-titled album, was released February 2004. He toured France and Switzerland in late 2003 along French group L5 and solo throughout 2004.

Chatelain showcased original and creative sense of style in the Star Academy. He knew how to sew and often made his own clothes or altered them. Along with music, fashion was his other big passion. In 2003, he announced the creation of Sir Sid, his own line of clothing and accessories for both men and women. His first collection hit France's stores in 2004. On 6 November 2003 he married the singer Alizée Jacotey in Las Vegas, Nevada, USA. They lived in separation after 2011 when Alizée moved back to Ajaccio with Annily. Jérémy and Alizée divorced in early 2012.

In early 2006, Jérémy released Katmandou, the first single to his second album. His second album, Variétés Françaises, was released 13 March 2006. Jérémy toured France in July as part of the  "L'été Française Des Jeux – Tournée Des Plages RTL" where he performed three songs. His current single is J'veux Qu'on M'enterre.

Discography

Albums

Singles 

* Promo Single Only
All peak positions on the France Top 200 Albums & Top 100 Singles Chart

External links
  Official Website
  Jeremy Chatelain at the IMDb

References

1984 births
Living people
People from Créteil
French people of Jewish descent
French pop singers
Star Academy (France) participants
21st-century French singers
21st-century French male singers